Adrian "Haydn" Green (18 March 1887 – 8 February 1957) was an English football player and manager. After playing for Nottingham Forest, Manchester United, Aston Villa, Newport County and Reading, he went on to manage Ebbw Vale, Bangor, Hull City, Swansea Town and Watford.

At Hull City, whom he managed from May 1931 until March 1934, Green maintained a winning percentage of 49.59%.

References

External links

1887 births
1957 deaths
People from Nottinghamshire
English footballers
Nottingham Forest F.C. players
Manchester United F.C. players
Aston Villa F.C. players
Newport County A.F.C. players
Reading F.C. players
English football managers
Hull City A.F.C. managers
Bangor F.C. managers
Swansea City A.F.C. managers
Watford F.C. managers
Association footballers not categorized by position
Ebbw Vale F.C. managers